Marie Mejzlíková (later Majerová), 1903-1994, was a Czech athlete, who competed in the long jump, sprint, and throwing events. She won the 60 m and finished second in the 100 yd at the 1922 Women's World Games. The same year she set the first officially recognized world records in the long jump and 100 m events. On May 21, 1922 she also set the first world record in Women's 4 x 100 metres relay (with Marie Mejzlíková I, Marie Bakovská, Marie Jirásková and Marie Mejzlíková II).

She often competed alongside another Czech sprinter Marie Mejzlíková, they are usually named as Marie Mejzlíková I (born 1902) and Marie Mejzlíková II in the athletics lists.

References

Date of birth unknown
Date of death unknown
Czech female sprinters
Czech female long jumpers
World record setters in athletics (track and field)
1903 births
1994 deaths
Women's World Games medalists